Jungmun Saekdal Beach is a beach in Saekdal-dong, in the city of Seogwipo-si, South Korea. The beach is 560 meters long and 50 meters wide, and the sand features a variety of colors, including black, white, red, and gray. In 1999, by a result of an environmental water quality investigation conducted by the Korean Federation for Environmental Movement, Jungmun Saekdal Beach was chosen as the best uncontaminated beach among 44 beaches in South Korea. Jungmun Saekdal Beach holds events like the Winter Sea Penguin Swimming Competition, Summer Shore Movie Expo, and the International Surfing Competition.

Natural environment
There is a 15 meter high sea cave on the right side of the sandbar and behind the cave, rocks are surrounded like the byeongpung (Korean traditional folding screen). During the ebb tide, the beach generates the hanging water on the right entrance of the bay. The current is rather rough, and many surfers come to the beach. In the past, bidan moshi clams (a kind of clam found in Jeju) were often caught. During June and July, wangbadageobuk (a kind of big sea turtle), an endangered species, occasionally comes up the shore and lay eggs.

With the Seogwipo Chilsiplihaean beach as the center, Jungmun Tourist Complex sits on the left and has views of the beach.

Surfing 
Jungmun Beach is the home of the first surfing club in Korea, established in 1995.  In this surfing spot is hosted an Annual Jeju Surfing Competition since 2005, and Korean people use to visit the beach to learn to surf.   In summer, swells from the south are common.

Facilities
The Jungmun Saekdal Beach has a number of facilities for the visitors. Inside the area, there is an oceanarium, the Yeomigi Botanical Garden, Sun-im Bridge, and Cheonjeyeon Falls. In addition, many events are held all year round. A parking facility is also present with spaces for 150 cars.

References 

Beaches of South Korea
Geography of Jeju Province
Seogwipo
Surfing locations